Trial races for the Epsom Derby are horse races during April and May which are contested by three-year-olds likely to run in the Derby in early June.

Most Derby runners appear in at least one race in the weeks before the event, although some, such as the winners Lammtarra and Shaamit, may arrive at Epsom with no previous run as a three-year-old.

The leading trial of recent years has been the Dante Stakes, which has been contested by seven subsequent winners of the Derby in the last 29 years. The following table shows any race classed at Listed level or above which served as a trial for a Derby winner during the period 1992 to 2022.

See also
 Trial races for the Epsom Oaks

References
 Racing Post race records of the last twenty-one Derby winners:
 1992, 1993, 1994, 1995, 1996, 1997, 1998, 1999, 2000, 2001
 2002, 2003, 2004, 2005, 2006, 2007, 2008, 2009, 2010, 2011, 2012

 Trial races for the Epsom Derby
Epsom Derby